Greenham is a village and civil parish in Berkshire, England.

Greenham may also refer to:

RAF Greenham Common, former military airfield in Berkshire
Greenham (surname)
Greenham Stakes, horse race
Greenham Barton, manor house in Somerset, England
Greenham Lock, lock in Berkshire